Kaufman & Broad  is a publicly traded real estate development and construction company headquartered in Neuilly-sur-Seine, France. It was a subsidiary of the American homebuilding company KB Home until May 2007, when it was sold to the private equity firm PAI Partners for 601 million euros (812 million dollars). It is Paris's largest homebuilder.

History 
The company was created in 1968 and delivered its first homes in 1970. After a series of acquisitions Kaufman & Broad S.A. was listed on the Paris Bourse in 2000.  Kaufman & Broad sold homes in 1968; they had a development called Peppertree in Northridge, CA, that year.

Activities 
Kaufman & Broad  is a developer and constructor in a number of real estate sectors, including single-family homes, apartments,  accommodations and office spaces. It operates through its many subsidiaries.

Direction 
The current president of Kaufman & Broad S.A. is Guy Nafilyan.

Shareholders' structure
This is the shareholders' structure reported by the company as of 30 November 2011:

References

External links 
official website in english
official website in french

Real estate companies of France
Real estate companies established in 1968
Construction and civil engineering companies established in 1968
1968 establishments in France
Companies listed on Euronext Paris